= Flauto =

Flauto can refer to:

- Recorder (musical instrument) if flauto dolce, flauto a becco or flauto diritto
- Flute if flauto traverso
